Ladies Edition, Woman's World is the third studio album by American R&B group H-Town. It was released October 28, 1997 on Relativity Records. Ladies Edition is the group first release signed to the label, after releasing their first two albums on Luther Campbell's label, Luke Records. Hip-hop-influenced ballads and slow jams like "Ways to Treat a Woman," "A Natural Woman," and the single "They Like It Slow" have a more respectful tone, and the group is more conscious toward women with this album.

This was the final album released in Dino's lifetime.

Commercial reception
After the lead single "They Like It Slow" became a hit and peak to #12 on Billboard Top R&B Songs, Ladies Edition gained further popularity in the U.S., and the album quickly climbed to #12 on Billboard Top R&B Albums chart.

Track listing

 "Woman's Anthem Intro" - 2:10
 "Don't Sleep on the Female" - 2:54
 "Toon Girl" (Dino Conner) - 3:04
 "Die for You" - 3:30
 "Married Man" (Dino Conner) - 4:39
 "Beggars Can't Be Choosey" (Deja) - 4:05
 "Ways to Treat a Woman" - 
 "Don't Hold Back the Rain" - 3:49
 "I Sleep U I Wear U" - 4:12
 "They Like It Slow" - 4:36
 "Special Kinda Fool" - 4:07
 "A Natural Woman" - 5:50
 "Shoot 'Em Up" (Dino Conner) - 4:51
 "Jezebel" - 3:45
 "Woman's World" - 3:46
 "Mindtaker" (Shazam Conner) - 4:40
 "Visions in My Mind" - 4:01
 "Julie Rain" - 4:15
 "Woman's Anthem" - 4:50

Personnel
Composer – Keven "Dino" Conner
Composer – Solomon "Shazam" Conner
Guest Artist – Roger Troutman
Guitar – Brian Conner, [Additional Guitar] Randy Washington
Bass – Gary Williams
Producer, Arranger, Composer, Multi-Instruments, Mixing, Programming – Keven "Dino" Conner
Engineer – Micah Harrison, Dave Huron
Engineer, Mixer – Charles Nasser
Composer, Guest Artist, Producer – Deja (tracks: 6)
Producer – Keven "Dino" Conner

Production from album liner notes.

Charts

Singles

References

External links
Ladies Edition (CD, Album) - Discogs
Ladies Edition - Amazon

1997 albums
H-Town (band) albums